Thomas Russell (fl. 1417–1433) of Chichester, Sussex, was an English politician.

He was a Member (MP) of the Parliament of England for Chichester in 1417, for Midhurst in 1419, for Reigate in 1432 and for East Grinstead in 1433.

References

Year of birth missing
15th-century deaths
English MPs 1417
People from Chichester
English MPs 1419
English MPs 1432
English MPs 1433